Ishiobiukwu Gedegwum is the ancient palace of the Orlu people. This is the residence of the traditional monarchy of Orlu, known as the Igwe of Orlu in Nigeria. Located in Imo state, the palace is often at the centre of state occasions and royal hospitality. It has always been a focal point for traditional festivals, ceremonies and dispute resolution.

The original pre-colonial features, many of which survive, include the Ancient Obi-Hall, the remodelled Mansion of Duruojinnaka (and his forebears), the old Kitchen, Antique Expedition Cannons, the Ekwe-ukwu, the symbolic Iroko trees and the Central Chrysophyllum africanum-tree in Ishiobiukwu of Orlu. Eze Patick I, Crown-Prince Pats-Acholonu, Dr. B.C. Douglas Acholonu, Igwe Patrick II and other members of the Royal family oversaw the remodelling of the estate from the 1930s to the 2020s.

Current Obi custodian

 

The current King of Orlu and custodian of Ishiobiukwu Gedegwum is Eze Dr. Patrick II Chinedu Acholonu, Igwe XI, Duru IX of Orlu. As the eleventh Igwe (King), he is also the ninth Duru (Noble), the highest Ofor holder, Opara or Okwara (Primus inter pares) and Obi Custodian of the Orlu kingdom. Igwe-XI is the head of "Ogu-Ọzọ" traditional heritage and the Ọzọ institution. He is a humble servant of Orlu town. His siblings are: 
 Prince Christopher Acholonu currently in the United States
 Prince Kodizie Acholonu currently in the United Kingdom
 Ada Ugo Patience Effosa nee Acholonu

Acholonu is an old family name that originated from the House of Duru (nobility). They are descendants of the ancient bloodline of Okwaraigweolu (First-born king of Orlu), who was granted Ọfọ-ukwu of the land. It was Ishiuburu who founded the Ozo society in Orlu. He took the title Okwaraugwelle - Okwaraigweolu. Ugwelle has been described to mean Igweolu - Igwe of Orlu, the title borne by the holders of the sceptre of Orlu's royal ancestry.

Ancient Obi
The Obi is a hallowed place. Every Igbo family, kindred (Ụmụ-Ọkala), village, town or kingdom respects the symbolism of the Obi. The Obi, in all its essence, represents the socio-political and spiritual centre of the people's link to their ancestry. At the central level is the Oshiobi-ukwu - the foremost of all the Obi's.

Ishiobiukwu Gedegwum is the spiritual, symbolic and physical space of the palace, ancestral descent and the inviolable profundity of the everlasting ancient Nobles (Durus) of old Orlu.

The appellation of Gedegwum means, that which was established in the origin, from which other things came forth.

Ishiobiukwu ceremonies & Palace Activities
 Eze-in-Council meetings
 New Yam Festival (Ịri-ji)
 Ụmụ-Ọkala Assembly
 Masquerade Dance Ceremony at Ama-Ukwu
 Bestowing of Chieftaincy title
 Prayers and Thanksgiving

See also
 Orlu
 Obi
 Acholonu
 Dynasty
 Non-sovereign African monarchs
 List of Nigerian traditional states

References

External links
 Longest reigning monarch, Igwe Acholonu, dies at 104

Palaces in Nigeria